Statistics of UAE Football League for the 1973–74 season.

Overview
The season was played as a trial season with two stages. First round being divided into three regional groups and final being played between the three winners. Al-Orouba won the championship after defeating Al Ahli and Oman.

First round

Group 1
 Al Najah
 Al Nasr (Dubai)
 Al Orouba (winners)
 Al Shaab 
 Shoala Al Ajmani
 Zamalek

Group 2
 Ajman
 Al Ahli (Dubai) (winners)
 Al Khaleej 
 Al Nasr (Ajman)
 Al Shabab

Group 3
 Al Ahly (Fujairah)
 Al Hisn
 Al Rams
 Kalba
 Oman (winners)
 Ras Al Khaimah

Final

References
United Arab Emirates - List of final tables (RSSSF)

UAE Pro League seasons
1973–74 in Emirati football
Emir